The All-Ireland Senior Football Championship 2005, known for sponsorship reasons as the 2005 Bank of Ireland All-Ireland Senior Football Championship was the premier Gaelic football competition in 2005. It consisted of 33 teams and began on Saturday 7 May 2005. Few surprises came during the championship with the dominance of the Ulster teams evident once again. Gaelic football's "Big Three" of this era - Armagh, Kerry, Tyrone - all progressed to the semi-finals.

The Championship concluded on Sunday 25 September 2005 when Tyrone defeated Kerry, who were playing in their second consecutive All-Ireland Final, by a scoreline of 1-16 to 2-10. Tyrone had to play ten games (including three replays) in order to win the Championship - more than any other team before or since.

Format
Since the introduction of the so-called "back-door" system a few years ago, a number of changes have taken place in the championship format. In 2005 the following system was used.

The provincial championships in Munster, Leinster, Ulster and Connacht ran as usual on a "knock-out" basis.  These provincial games were then followed by the "Qualifier" system:
Round 1 of the qualifiers included all the counties that did not qualify for the Provincial Semi-finals. An open draw was made to give eight pairings.
Round 2 consisted of the eight defeated teams in the Provincial Semi-finals playing against the eight winners from Round 1. A draw was made to determine the eight pairings.
Round 3 Consisted of the 8 winners from Round 2 playing each other in an open draw format.
Round 4 consisted of each of the four teams defeated in the Provincial Finals shall playing against the four winners from Round 3. A draw was made to determine the four pairings.

The All-Ireland Quarter-finals: Each of the four Provincial Champions played one of the four winners from Round 4. The All-Ireland Semi-finals shall be on a Provincial rots basis, initially determined by the Central Council. If a Provincial Championship winning team is defeated in its Quarter-final, the team that defeats it shall take its place in the Semi-final.

Provincial championships

Munster Senior Football Championship

Quarter-finals

Semi-finals

Final

Leinster Senior Football Championship

Round 1

Quarter-finals

Semi-finals

Final

Ulster Senior Football Championship

Round 1

Quarter-finals

Semi-finals

Final

Connacht Senior Football Championship

Quarter-finals

Semi-finals

Final

All-Ireland qualifiers
The losers of the Preliminary round matches and quarter final matches of each provincial championship started the qualifier.

Round 1

Round 2 
The winners of round 1 were joined by the semi final losers of each provincial championship. The matches would be between a round 2 winner and a provincial championship semi final loser.

Round 3 
The winners of round 2 contest as the matches from here were lowered to four. Matches were open.

Round 4 
The winners of round 3 were joined by the losers of each provincial championship final. The matches would be between a round 3 winner and the loser of a provincial championship final.

All-Ireland
The provincial champions and the winners of round 4 contested the quarter finals. The quarter final matches would be between a provincial champion and a round 4 winner.

Quarter-finals

Semi-finals

Final

Championship statistics

Miscellaneous

 For the first time since 1992 Kildare vs Westmeath in the Leinster championship.
 Dublin played Laois in the Leinster final for the first time 1985.
 In the old system there would have been Kerry vs Galway and Dublin vs Armagh All Ireland semi-finals.

Top scorers

Season

Single game

References

All-Ireland Senior Football Championship